

Events

1890
 6 May – The Pioneer Column left Cecil Rhodes' farm at Kenilworth, a suburb of Kimberley, for Macloutsie under Col. Pennefather and Sir John Willoughby
 29 June – Archibald Ross Colquhoun becomes the Resident Commissioner of Mashonaland
 July – Fort Tuli is built by the Pioneer Column at the place known as Selous Camp and used by Frederick Selous as a base for his hunting expeditions.
 13 September – The Pioneer Column ran up the Union Jack on Harare Hill in Salisbury and claimed Mashonaland for the British Empire, having arrived the previous day
 1 October – The Pioneer Column is disbanded and each member is granted land on which to farm

1891
 15 February – A temporary frontier at Manica is settled.
 9 May – Mashonaland, Matabeleland and Bechuanaland are declared British Protectorates in London by Order in Council.
 12 June – The United Kingdom and Portuguese governments reach agreement on the means of determining boundaries between their territories.
 27 June – First edition of the Mashonaland Herald, later the Rhodesia Herald and later still the Zimbabwe Herald
 18 September –  Leander Starr Jameson becomes the first Administrator of Mashonaland
 22 December – The British South Africa Company holds its first annual meeting in London.

1892
 22 June – Kopje Fort is completed at Salisbury.
 29 October – The Rhodesia Herald commences publication.

1893
 18 July – Matabele impi enter Victoria and attack the Mashona
 2 October – Lobengula's impis attack patrols of the British South Africa company
 3 October – War on the Matabele is authorised – First Matabele War
 8 October – 22 January 1894 – Andrew Duncan becomes acting administrator for Leander Starr Jameson
 4 November – British forces occupy the site of Bulawayo. This marks the effective occupation of Matabeleland by British settlers
 3 December – British forces, in search of King Lobengula, suffer a humiliating defeat near the Shangani river. The incident becomes known as the Shangani Patrol. The remains of the 34 Patrol members killed on that day were eventually interred next to the bodies of Cecil Rhodes and Leander Starr Jameson at World's View in the Matobo Hills. The American scout, Frederick Russell Burnham, is one of only three survivors of the Patrol.

1894
 Spring – Matabele King Lobengula dies of unknown causes. His death is kept a secret from the British for many months. 
 23 January – Mashonaland and Matabeleland protectorates merge to form South Zambesia
 Andrew Duncan is made the acting Chief magistrate of South Zambesia
 May – Leander Starr Jameson is elected Chief magistrate of South Zambesia
 9 September – Leander Jameson becomes the Administrator of the South Zambesia Protectorate
 28 October – 1 April 1895 – Francis Rhodes stands in for Leander Jameson as acting Administrator of the South Zambesia Protectorate

1895
 3 May – South Zambesia and North Zambesia are united as Rhodesia (after Cecil Rhodes)
 June – Joseph Vintcent becomes acting Administrator of the Rhodesia Protectorate
 29 December – The Jameson raid is commenced.

1896
 2 January – Leander Starr Jameson and his raiders surrender
 20 March – The First Chimurenga revolt against the British South Africa Company starts among the Matabele
 2 May – Albert Grey, 4th Earl Grey becomes the second Administrator of Mashonaland and Administrator of the Rhodesia Protectorate 
 14 June – The Mashona join in the First Chimurenga.
 13 October – The Matabele are defeated by the British South Africa Company, and their chiefs concede
 November – Arthur Lawley becomes the Administrator of Matabeleland
 29 November – British forces leave Rhodesia as it is believed local troops can now defeat the Mashona

1897
 January – Final determination of the boundary between Rhodesia and Portuguese possessions to the east
 24 July – William Henry Milton becomes the 3rd Administrator of Mashonaland and Administrator of the Rhodesia Protectorate 
 26 October – The municipalities of Salisbury and Bulawayo are formally created.
 27 October – The Mashona are defeated by the British South Africa Company thus ending the First Chimurenga.

1898
 Rhodesia south of the Zambezi is renamed the Colony of Southern Rhodesia

1899
 An Order in Council grants Southern Rhodesia a part-elected Legislative council.
 17 April: Polling day in the first Legislative Council election. 
 15 May: First session of the Legislative Council.

Births
 1893 – John Noble Kennedy, Governor of Southern Rhodesia from January 1947 to November 1953
 6 February 1893 John Jestyn Llewellin, 1st Baron Llewellin, Governor-general of the Federation of Rhodesia and Nyasaland from September 1953 to January 1957
 1897 – Henry Bredon Everard, three times acting President of the Republic of Rhodesia
 1898 – Peveril William-Powlett, Governor of Southern Rhodesia from November 1954 to December 1959
 1899 – Robert Clarkson Tredgold, acting Governor of Southern Rhodesia from November 1953 to November 1954 and acting Governor-general of the Federation of Rhodesia and Nyasaland from January to February 1957

Deaths
 1894 – Lobengula Kumalo dies
 1898 – Nehanda and Kaguvi, two spirit mediums are hanged

See also
1880s in Zimbabwe 
1900 in Zimbabwe
Years in Zimbabwe

References 

Decades in Zimbabwe
Zimbabwe